MS Chinese Taishan is a cruise ship that was formerly owned by Royal Olympic Cruises and Carnival Corporation & plc, sailing for  Carnival subsidiaries Costa Crociere and Ibero Cruises as Grand Voyager.

On 14 February 2005, the MV Grand Voyager was struck by a freak wave during a mistral storm while operating in the Mediterranean.  A 40 to 50 foot tall wave knocked out a window on the bridge and ingressing water disabled the ship's engine controls.  Dramatic video of the ship helplessly adrift and rolling to extreme angles was captured by rescue helicopters.  This incident occurred less than a month after a similar situation happened aboard Grand Voyager'''s sister-ship the MV Explorer operating in the Pacific.

She entered service for Costa in December 2011, originally planned to sail Costa's Corals and Ancient Treasures Red Sea itinerary. She sailed in the Mediterranean and Northern Europe, dedicated to guests from the French market. The ship has sailed voyages from Amsterdam and the Mediterranean Sea.

The vessel was sold for 43.68 million US-Dollar to Bohai Ferry Company from Yantai in February 2014, and was renamed Chinese Taishan''.

References

External links

  Ship specifications and history

1999 ships
Cruise ships of Portugal
Ships of Costa Cruises